Sarat Chandra may refer to the following:

People 
 Sarat Chandra Bose (1889–1950), Indian barrister and independence activist
 Sarat Chandra Chattopadhyay (1876–1938), Indian novelist and short story writer
 Sarat Chandra Das (1849–1917), Indian scholar of Tibetan language and culture
 Sarat Chandra Pandit (1881–1968), Indian composer
 Sarat Chandra Roy (1871–1942), Indian scholar of anthropology
 Sarat Chandra Sinha (1914–2005), Indian politician
 Sarat Chandralal Fonseca (1950-prsent), Field Marshal of Sri Lankan army

Places 
 Sarat Chandra Kuthi (house of Sarat Chandra Chattopadhyay)